Rousey v. Jacoway, 544 U.S. 320 (2005), was a bankruptcy case decided by the United States Supreme Court in which the Court held that Individual Retirement Accounts (IRAs) qualify for certain exemptions under Title 11 of the United States Code.

Background 
Richard and Betty Jo Rousey filed a joint Chapter 7 bankruptcy petition in the United States Bankruptcy Court for the Western District of Arkansas. They petitioned the court to shield portions of their IRAs from their creditors under section 522(d)(10)(E) of the United States Bankruptcy Code. Jill Jacoway, the Chapter 7 trustee, objected to the petition, and the court sustained the objection. The Bankruptcy Appellate Panel and the Eight Circuit Court of Appeals both affirmed.

Opinion of the Court 
Justice Thomas delivered the opinion of the unanimous court.

The Court held that IRAs qualify for exemption because such plans are intended to substitute income (like other plans and programs specifically listed in the statute) and payments from the plan are because of one's age, thus satisfying the section's requirements.

External links
 

2005 in United States case law
United States bankruptcy case law
United States Supreme Court cases
United States Supreme Court cases of the Rehnquist Court